ARV may refer to:

 Antiretroviral drug, any drug used to treat retroviral infections, primarily in the management of HIV/AIDS
 arv, ISO 639-3 language code for the Arbore language, an East Cushitic language
 Average rectified value, in mathematics and electrical engineering, the average of an absolute value
After-repair value, estimated of the value of a real estate property after repair for  flipping 
 ARV, IATA code for Lakeland Airport in Minocqua and Woodruff, Wisconsin
 Al Rojo Vivo (Telemundo), a Spanish-language afternoon news magazine program on Telemundo
 Australian Refugee Volunteers, formerly the Australian League of Immigration Volunteers
 Arv, Nordic Yearbook of Folklore, published by the Royal Gustavus Adolphus Academy
 Arv (album), a 2008 album by the Norwegian Viking/folk metal band Ásmegin
ARV Sculling, an Antwerp rowing club

Vehicles
 ARV, the United States Navy hull classification symbol for "aircraft repair ship"
 Advanced Re-entry Vehicle, a proposed crewed ESA spacecraft
 Armed response vehicle, a type of police car operated by the British police
 Armoured recovery vehicle, a military vehicle used to repair or recover other military vehicles
 Ammunition Resupply Vehicle, a military support vehicle for self-propelled howitzers fielded by South Korea
 XM1219 Armed Robotic Vehicle, an unmanned military vehicle of the United States Army
 ARV, former British aircraft manufacturer (1985–1989), originator of the ARV Super2, a light aircraft
 Axiom Return Vehicle, a fictional spaceship in the 2008 film WALL-E
 Alien Reproduction Vehicle, a purported reconstruction of a UFO